Armand Renaud Lavergne,  or La Vergne (February 21, 1880 – March 5, 1935) was a Quebec lawyer, journalist and political figure. He represented Montmagny in the House of Commons of Canada as a Liberal member from 1904 to 1908 and as a Conservative member from 1930 to 1935. He represented Montmagny in the Legislative Assembly of Quebec as a Nationalist member from 1908 to 1916. His surname is given as "La Vergne" by some authoritative sources, including his National Assembly of Quebec biographical page, although these same sources spell his father's name as "Lavergne".

He was born in Arthabaska, Quebec in 1880, the son of Joseph Lavergne and Émilie Barthe, who was the daughter of Joseph-Guillaume Barthe. Lavergne studied at the Collège Sacré-Coeur at Arthabaska, the Séminaire de Québec, the University of Ottawa and Université Laval; he later studied in Paris. He articled in law, was called to the bar in 1903 and set up practice at Quebec City and then Montmagny. In 1903, he helped found the Ligue nationaliste canadienne. Lavergne directed Le Courrier at Montmagny and also contributed to Le Nationaliste, edited by Olivar Asselin, and Le Devoir, edited by Henri Bourassa.

He was elected to the House of Commons in a 1904 by-election and reelected in the general election later that year. He was expelled from the Liberal Party by Sir Wilfrid Laurier in 1907 and he resigned from his seat the following year to run for Ligue nationaliste canadienne in the 1908 Quebec election. He was elected to the legislative assembly along with Henri Bourassa and re-elected in the 1912 Quebec election; Lavergne served as the party's only member from 1912 until leaving office in the 1916 election.

In 1910, he was instrumental in achieving passage of what came to be known as the "Loi Lavergne", the first language legislation in Quebec, which required the use of French alongside English in tickets, documents, bills and contracts issued by transportation and public utility companies.

In 1904, he had married Georgette, the daughter of Philippe-Honoré Roy, a member of the Quebec assembly. He was named King's Counsel in 1918. He ran unsuccessfully as an independent candidate for a seat in the House of Commons in 1917 and 1921 before joining the federal Conservatives in 1925. He was deputy speaker and chairman of committees from 1930 to 1935. Lavergne also served as lieutenant-colonel in the militia.

Lavergne opposed the use of conscription during the First World War, was an ardent defender of French language rights outside of Quebec and lobbied for more French-Canadian participation in the federal civil service.

In 1935, he published an autobiography, Trente ans de vie nationale''.

Lavergne died in office at Ottawa in 1935 and was buried in Arthabaska, Quebec (today part of Victoriaville).

Parentage
Though never firmly proven, there is a substantial amount of conjecture that Armand Lavergne was the illegitimate son of Prime Minister Sir Wilfrid Laurier.  It was widely speculated that his mother, Émilie, had a long-standing extramarital affair with Laurier, her husband's law practice partner.  Photographs of a young Armand bear an uncanny facial resemblance to Laurier.

Archives 
There is an Armand Lavergne family fonds at Library and Archives Canada. Archival reference number is R6172. There is also an Armand Lavergne fonds at Bibliothèque et Archives nationales du Québec.

Electoral record

References

External links
 

Entry in Canadian Encyclopedia

1880 births
1935 deaths
Members of the House of Commons of Canada from Quebec
Liberal Party of Canada MPs
Conservative Party of Canada (1867–1942) MPs
Members of the National Assembly of Quebec
Canadian King's Counsel